The SAF Military Police Command is the military police formation of the Singapore Armed Forces (SAF). Established as the Singapore Armed Forces Provost Unit (SAFPU) in 1966, its primary role is to police duties to uphold standards of discipline within the SAF, and to provide security coverage for key SAF military installations and the Ministry of Defence (MINDEF) headquarters at Bukit Gombak. 

The Military Police Command also perform guard mounting at the Istana, and form the ceremonial guard of honour for state visits by foreign dignitaries and at other national events. Moreover, they maintain discipline within the SAF through enforcement and the operation of the SAF Detention Barracks, and search and rescue operations, amongst other duties. In wartime contingencies, the Military Police Command would be tasked with safeguarding prisoners-of-war, protecting rear echelon areas and headquarters, as well as securing important supply routes and relevant bases for Singapore.

History 
The SAF Military Police Command started on 26 August 1966 as a single company known as the Provost Company, which formally started operations at Beach Road Camp, where the first detention cells were located. At the time, the Provost Company was part of the Manpower Division and under the command of the 1st Singapore Infantry Brigade. When National Service started in 1967, the Provost Company grew in size and moved to Hill Street Camp in 1970. Two other companies, the Dog and Operations companies, were established at Hill Street Camp.

The Provost, Dog and Operations companies merged in February 1971 to form the SAF Provost Unit (SAFPU) and moved to Mowbray Camp at Ulu Pandan Road in July that year. Two sub-units, the Security Company and the Special Investigations Branch (SIB), were added to the SAFPU in 1973. The following year, a sixth sub-unit, the 1st Reservist Provost Company, was formed in the SAFPU. Up to the late 1980s, the SAFPU operated four different detention barracks located at Tanglin (opened in 1972), Changi (opened in 1973), Nee Soon (opened in 1974) and Kranji (opened in 1977). 

The Operations Company took on ceremonial functions in 1980 and formed the first guard of honour for the German ambassador to Singapore. The SAFPU brown uniform was first introduced in 1983. The following year, a 93-men unit drawn from the SAFPU formed the Silent Precision Drill Squad (SPDS), who trained under the guidance of foreign instructors for a performance during the 1984 National Day Parade at the Padang. The SPDS performed again during the 1986 and 1988 National Day Parades. They also served as the guard of honour during the opening ceremony of the 1993 Southeast Asian Games.

Starting in the mid-1980s, the SAFPU have been performing ceremonial sentry duties at the Istana, the official residence of the President of Singapore, and the monthly guard mounting ceremony outside the Istana. In 1995, President Ong Teng Cheong presented the SAFPU with its colours.

The SAFPU has moved to a new camp along Choa Chu Kang Way. Keeping with tradition, the road leading to the camp is named Mowbray Road and the new camp itself is still called Mowbray Camp. The SAF Detention Barracks was opened on 29 March 1987 next to the new Mowbray Camp to replace all the different detention barracks previously operated by the SAFPU. The old Mowbray Camp at Ulu Pandan has since been handed over to the Singapore Police Force and is currently used by the Protective Security Command (ProCom).

On 1 September 2006, SAFPU was renamed SAF Military Police Command and officially inaugurated by Lieutenant-General Ng Yat Chung, the Chief of Defence Force. The SAF Military Police Command came under the command of HQ 2nd People's Defence Force and expanded to include the SAF Band, Ministry of Defence (MINDEF) headquarters, and the 8th and 9th Battalions, Singapore Infantry Regiment in 2011.

Organisation 
The SAF Military Police Command is headed by the Command Headquarters at Mowbray Camp. Its operational duties are subdivided into five categories – enforcement, ceremonial, security, incarceration, and criminal investigation – carried out by the Military Police Enforcement Unit (MPEU), Security Troopers from 8 SIR and 9 SIR, the SAF Detention Barracks, and the Special Investigation Branch (SIB).

Military Police Enforcement Unit (MPEU) 

The Military Police Enforcement Unit (MPEU) serves as the main enforcement arm of the SAF Military Police Command. It comprises three companies: the Law Enforcement and Ceremonial Company (LEEC), the Support Company, and the Military Working Dog Unit (MWDU).

The LEEC routinely conducts spot-checks in SAF camps, bases, vessels, and on personnel returning from overseas deployment. They are also trained to conduct anti-riot operations in SAF camps and the SAF Detention Barracks. The LEEC has a Presidential Guards Platoon that mounts the guard of honour contingent for military and state events, and serve as ceremonial sentries at the Istana, as well as performing the guard mounting ceremony outside the Istana on the first Sunday of every month. The Silent Precision Drill Squad (SPDS), which is under the LEEC, performs silent precision drills at the National Day Parade and international military tattoos. The LEEC also has a Special Security and Protection (SSP) Platoon that provides close protection cover for key appointment holders in the SAF and Ministry of Defence (MINDEF).

The Support Company has a Traffic Platoon that performs escort duties and conducts patrols to ensure that SAF personnel driving military vehicles comply with traffic regulations. It also has a Security Operations Detachment that works closely with the Singapore Police Force to arrest SAF personnel who have deserted or gone AWOL or committed other military offences. It has an Escort and Processing Office Platoon in charge of registering and detaining suspects in holding cells at Mowbray Camp.

The MWDU is in charge of training sniffer dogs and guard dogs and carrying out operations involving these dogs.

Security Troopers 
Security Troopers from the 8th Battalion, Singapore Infantry Regiment (8 SIR) provide security coverage at SAF camps, bases and military installations around Singapore, while Security Troopers from the 9th Battalion, Singapore Infantry Regiment (9 SIR) provide security coverage at key installations such as Changi Airport, Sembawang Wharves and Jurong Island. The SAF Military Police Command also provides security coverage at the Ministry of Defence (MINDEF) headquarters at Bukit Gombak.

SAF Detention Barracks 
The SAF Military Police Command operates the SAF Detention Barracks, currently the only military prison in Singapore.

Special Investigation Branch (SIB) 
The Special Investigation Branch (SIB) carries out criminal investigations in the SAF and MINDEF for military-related offences, including drug offences, white-collar crimes and cybercrimes.

Training 
The Island Defence Training Institute (IDTI) conducts training for both active and reservist Military Police personnel and Security Troopers. The Security and Policing Leadership School (SPLS), one of four schools in IDTI, conducts a 13-week training course for Military Police specialist (non-commissioned officer) cadets.

Uniforms 
SAF Military Police wear different uniforms for specific duties or occasions. Their Number 3 uniform consists of a olive drab uniform shirt, olive drab pants, a pair of combat boots, a white stable belt, a white lanyard with a whistle, and a white helmet with the letters "MP" in red, or a dark blue beret. They also wear the pixelised camouflage Number 4 uniform with a black leather brassard on the right arm bearing the letters "MP" in orange. Security Troopers wear the Number 4 uniform with a brassard bearing the words "Security Trooper". They wear the Number 1 uniform at parades or ceremonial functions such as mounting a guard of honour. The SAF Military Police has a cap badge design featuring the Coat of Arms of Singapore and laurels similar to those on the Singapore Armed Forces crest, and a ribbon design bearing the words "SAF Military Police" similar to that on the Singapore Police Force crest.

Equipment 
The SAF Military Police use a variety of firearms for use in both active duty and ceremonial functions. They are also equipped with truncheons for self-defence, as well as handcuffs and cable ties to restrain suspects.

References

Further reading
 Chiang, Mickey (1990) Fighting fit: The Singapore Armed Forces Times Editions, Singapore 
 Choo, Martin (1981) The Singapore Armed Forces Public Affairs Department, Ministry of Defence, Singapore

External links
 Official website
 Pride, Discipline and Honour
 Changing of the Guards Ceremony
Silent Drill by SAF MP Command Silent Drill Precision Squad (SDPS)
Ep 3: Pride and Honour (The SAF Military Police Command)

Provost
Law enforcement agencies of Singapore
Western Water Catchment
Military provosts